In the 2019–20 season, CR Belouizdad competed in Ligue 1 for the 54th season, as well as for the CAF Confederation Cup and the Algerian Cup. On March 15, 2020, the Ligue de Football Professionnel (LFP) decided to halt the season due to the COVID-19 pandemic in Algeria. On July 29, 2020, the LFP declared that season is over and CR Belouizdad to be the champion, the promotion of four teams from the League 2, and scraping the relegation for the current season.

Summary season
After the big problems last season, Where almost the team dropped to the second division with the start of the new season, coach Abdelkader Amrani decided to stay and his first decisions was to demobilize seven players, who are Mohamed Attia, Lyes Meziane, Mohamed Herida, Meziane Zeroual, Abou Sofiane Balegh, Djamel Chettal and Djamel Rabti., CR Belouizdad contracted the same number of laid-off players who are Zakaria Khali and Larbi Tabti from USM Bel Abbès, Ahmed Gasmi and Gaya Merbah from NA Hussein Dey, Mohamed Khoutir Ziti, Islam Bendif and Ivorian Kouame Noel N'Guessan from Séwé FC. With the start of the season, CR Belouizdad is the only team that has not had any financial problems thanks to Madar Holding Company and One of the goals of CR Belouizdad this season is to win the league title absent since the 2000–01 season The start was good, where the team was unbeaten in eight consecutive league matches until the tenth round against CS Constantine. On December 26, Amrani decided to resign. after that Madar Company appointed a new sports director in the place of Saïd Allik, Toufik Korichi. On January 9, after MC Alger lost to ES Sétif CR Belouizdad won the honorary title of winter champion.

Pre-season

Mid-season

Competitions

Overview

{| class="wikitable" style="text-align: center"
|-
!rowspan=2|Competition
!colspan=8|Record
!rowspan=2|Started round
!rowspan=2|Final position / round
!rowspan=2|First match	
!rowspan=2|Last match
|-
!
!
!
!
!
!
!
!
|-
| Ligue 1

|  
| style="background:gold;"| Winners
| 15 August 2019
| 7 March 2020
|-
| Algerian Cup

| Round of 64
| Round of 16
| 28 December 2019
| 13 February 2020
|-
| Confederation Cup

| Preliminary round
| First round
| 10 August 2019
| 29 September 2019
|-
! Total

Ligue 1

League table

Results summary

Results by round

Matches

Notes:

Algerian Cup

Confederation Cup

Preliminary round

First round

Squad information

Playing statistics

|-
! colspan=12 style=background:#dcdcdc; text-align:center| Goalkeepers

|-
! colspan=12 style=background:#dcdcdc; text-align:center| Defenders

|-
! colspan=12 style=background:#dcdcdc; text-align:center| Midfielders

|-
! colspan=12 style=background:#dcdcdc; text-align:center| Forwards

|-
! colspan=12 style=background:#dcdcdc; text-align:center| Players transferred out during the season

Goalscorers
Includes all competitive matches. The list is sorted alphabetically by surname when total goals are equal.

Squad list
As of 15 August 2019.

Transfers

In

Out

Notes

References

2019-20
CR Belouizdad